The 1985–86 Notre Dame Fighting Irish men's basketball team represented the University of Notre Dame during the 1985-86 college basketball season. The Irish were led by head coach Digger Phelps, in his 15th season, and played their home games at the Athletic & Convocation Center in Notre Dame, Indiana. The Irish completed a perfect season at home (15–0). Notre Dame earned an at-large bid to the NCAA tournament where they were upset by Arkansas–Little Rock in the opening round. The team finished with a 23–6 record and a No. 10 ranking in the final AP poll.

Roster

Schedule and results

|-
!colspan=9 style=| Regular Season

|-
!colspan=9 style=| NCAA Tournament

Rankings

References

Notre Dame Fighting Irish men's basketball seasons
Notre Dame
Notre Dame
Notre Dame Fighting Irish
Notre Dame Fighting Irish